B. edulis may refer to:

Bambusa edulis, a synonym for Phyllostachys edulis, a bamboo species
Boletus edulis, the cep, a mushroom species
Brahea edulis, the Guadalupe palm or palma de Guadalupe, a palm species native and almost endemic to Guadalupe Island, Mexico

See also
 Edulis (disambiguation)